Magical Flight is the 1977 album by the pioneer British folk musician Wizz Jones. In addition to composing some of the songs, Alan Tunbridge produced the U.K. cover artwork.

Track listing
"Pictures"  (Alan Tunbridge) - 4:25
"Mississippi John"  (Wizz Jones) - 2:01
"Old Fashioned Shotgun Wedding"  (Tucker Zimmerman) - 4:30
"Song to Woody"  (Bob Dylan) - 3:32
"Topolino Song"  (Wizz Jones) - 2:50
"Magical Flight"  (Alan Tunbridge) - 5:14
"The Valley"  (Wizz Jones) - 5:14
"See How the Time is Flying"  (Alan Tunbridge) - 5:19
"Canned Music"  (Dan Hicks) - 3:37

Issue details
Issued in Germany, 1978, with alternative cover art/remixed.
Exact reissue on CD, 1999, with both English and German covers (but title text on UK cover moved and enlarged, see illustration).

Catalogue numbers
Plant Life PLR009
Folk Freak FF4003(Germany)
Scenescof SCOFCD 1006 (US)

Personnel
Wizz Jones - guitar, vocals
Sandy Spencer - cello, banjo
Peter Berryman - guitar
Rick Kemp - bass
Nigel Pegrum - drums
Maddy Prior - background vocals
Bob Kerr - trumpet

References

Wizz Jones albums
1977 albums